North Columbia Academy is a public charter school in Rainier, Oregon, United States.

Academics
In 2008, 40% of the school's seniors received a high school diploma. Of five students, two graduated, two dropped out, and one was still in high school the following year.

References

High schools in Columbia County, Oregon
Charter schools in Oregon
Public high schools in Oregon